Evelyn Carolina de Oliveira dos Santos (born 11 April 1985 in Rio de Janeiro) is a Brazilian track and field athlete who competes in sprinting events.

Career
At the 2012 Summer Olympics, she competed in the Women's 200 metres. She has a personal best of 11.16 in the 100 metres, and a personal best of 22.76 in the 200 metres.

Also at London, the Brazilian women's 4 × 100 m relay team, composed of Ana Cláudia Lemos, Franciela Krasucki, Evelyn dos Santos and Rosângela Santos, broke the South American record in qualifying for the final, with a time of 42.55, and went to the final in sixth place. In the final, the Brazilian team ran 42.91 and finished seventh.

At the 2013 World Championships in Moscow, this same team again broke the South American record, in the semifinals of the women's 4 × 100 m relay, with a time of 42.29 seconds. In the final, Brazil was tied with Jamaica in second place and poised to take silver and break the South American record when, at the last baton exchange, Vanda, who was running in the Rosangela's place, let the baton fall.

Achievements

References

External links
 
 

1985 births
Living people
Brazilian female sprinters
Sportspeople from Rio de Janeiro (state)
Olympic athletes of Brazil
Athletes (track and field) at the 2008 Summer Olympics
Athletes (track and field) at the 2012 Summer Olympics
South American Games gold medalists for Brazil
South American Games bronze medalists for Brazil
South American Games medalists in athletics
Competitors at the 2002 South American Games
Olympic female sprinters